Sazeray is a commune in the Indre department in central France, in the region of Centre-Val de Loire.

Geography

Location 
The commune is situated in the southwest of the department, at the border with the department of Creuse. Nearby communes include Vigoulant, Tercillat, La Cellette, Nouziers, Pouligny Notre-Dame, and Sainte-Sévère-sur-Indre.

Hamlets and lieux-dits 
The commune's hamlets and lieux-dits are la Crie, le Grand Correix, and Villard.

Population

See also
Communes of the Indre department

References

Communes of Indre
Indre communes articles needing translation from French Wikipedia